The Lake Hunter Terrace Historic District is a U.S. historic district (designated as such on December 20, 2002) located in Lakeland, Florida. The district is bounded by roughly Central Avenue, Greenwood Street, Ruby Street, and Sikes Boulevard. It contains 163 historic buildings.

References

External links
 Polk County listings at National Register of Historic Places

Lakeland, Florida
National Register of Historic Places in Polk County, Florida
Historic districts on the National Register of Historic Places in Florida